The Star Trek: Deep Space Nine Role Playing Game is a role-playing game published by Last Unicorn Games in 1999.

History
Steven S. Long and Kenneth Hite joined in the developers working for Last Unicorn Games on the "Icon system" for their line of licensed Star Trek role-playing games; to get Star Trek: The Next Generation Role-playing Game ready for GenCon 31, they were flown out to Los Angeles for two weeks. After the design of Icon was done, Long was made the line developer for the Star Trek: Deep Space 9 role-playing game.

Bill Bridges was involved in the development of the Star Trek: Deep Space Nine role-playing game for Last Unicorn Games.

Publications
35000 - Star Trek: Deep Space Nine Role-playing Game (hardcover) 
35001 - DS9 Narrator's Toolkit (book & screen)  
35100 - Raiders, Renegades & Rogues

Reviews
Pyramid review

References

Last Unicorn Games games
Role-playing games based on Star Trek
Role-playing games introduced in 1999